Heron and Grey was a restaurant in Blackrock, County Dublin, Ireland. It was a fine dining restaurant that was awarded one Michelin star for 2017, 2018 and 2019.

The head chef was Damien Grey while Andrew Heron ran the restaurant. They owned the restaurant together. In January 2019 the restaurant closed down.

Awards
 Michelin star: 2017–2019 As of October 2019, Liath occupies the same space which formerly held Heron and Grey.

See also
List of Michelin starred restaurants in Ireland

References

Michelin Guide starred restaurants in Ireland
Defunct restaurants in Ireland
Restaurants disestablished in 2019
Restaurants established in 2015